Cicada is the self-titled debut album from the English electronic music group Cicada, released in the UK in August 2006. The album contained several songs that the band had released previously as 12-inch singles ("Electric Blue", "Cut Right Through", "The Things You Say"). Upon release Cicada earned positive reviews by music critics.

Track listing
"Edge" – 5:38
"You Got Me Feeling" – 5:43
"All About You" – 6:24
"The Things You Say" – 5:06
"Cicadas" – 4:23
"Electric Blue" – 4:59
"Tricks" – 4:55
"Cut Right Through" – 5:28
"Reprise" – 4:10
"I'm Waiting" – 5:49
"Harmonic" – 4:17
"Can't Be Doin With Love" – 6:55
"Elle Et Moi" – 14:52
"Elle Et Moi" ends at 6:44, and includes the hidden track "Golden Blue", beginning at 8:55

References 

2006 debut albums
Cicada (band) albums